Rodney Scott Woolf (born December 26, 1961) is a former American football quarterback who played for the Los Angeles Raiders of the National Football League (NFL). He played college football at University of Mount Union.

References 

1961 births
Living people
Sportspeople from Salem, Oregon
Players of American football from Oregon
American football quarterbacks
Ohio State Buckeyes football players
Mount Union Purple Raiders football players
Dallas Cowboys players
Los Angeles Raiders players
National Football League replacement players